Baykal is a village in Talachyn District, Vitebsk Region, Belarus, under the administration of the Kokhanovo Settlement Council.

Villages in Belarus
Populated places in Vitebsk Region
Talachyn District